Malaxis, commonly called adder's mouth, is a genus of terrestrial and semiepiphytic orchids. The generic name signifies "smooth" and alludes to the tender texture of the leaves. There are approximately 182 species, found mostly in tropics but with some species in temperate regions.

Species

References

 
Malaxideae genera
Taxa named by Olof Swartz